This is a list of notable in the Gambia

Schools (general)
 Muslim Senior Secondary School, Banjul (formerly Muslim High School)
 Nusrat Senior Secondary School, Bundung (formerly Nusrat High School)
 Gambia Senior Secondary School (formerly Gambia High School), Banjul
 Marina International School (private), Bakau New Town 
 École Française de Banjul, Bakau
 Banjul American Embassy School, Fajara 
 St Peter's Senior Seconday School, Lamin
 St Augustin Senior Secondary School,Banjul
 The Swallow Centre of Emancipating Education, Nursery and Lower Basic School, Manjai

Central River
Schools in the Central River Division include:

 Armitage Senior Secondary School, Janjanbureh

See also

 Education in the Gambia
 List of universities in the Gambia

External links
 List of Gambian Schools

Schools
Schools
Schools
Gambia, The
Gambia, The